The Alvis Firefly is a car manufactured by Alvis from 1932 until 1934. It followed on from the 12/50 TJ model.

The car had a four-cylinder engine with overhead valves. The engine, with a single SU carburettor and with a displacement of 1496 cm³, delivered  at 4500 rpm. The engine was essentially the same as the 12/50 TH model from 1927 and the 12/50 SD from 1927 to 1929. This made it cheap to manufacture and the model fitted into the 1.5-liter class which was popular at that time.

A roadster appeared in 1932. In 1933, a four-door touring car, a sedan and a two-door convertible were introduced under the name Alvis Firefly 12. The rigid axles front and rear were suspended by semi-elliptical leaf springs. The wheelbase, the type of suspension and, in some cases, the bodies, corresponded to the previous six-cylinder model Silver Eagle SE and TB. The top speed was approximately 71 mph depending on the design.

In 1934, the Firebird model replaced both Firefly models. Up until that point 904 Firefly Roadsters and 871 Firefly 12s had been built.

Sources
David Culshaw, Peter Horrobin: The Complete Catalogue of British Cars 1895–1975. Veloce Publishing, Dorchester 1997, Pp. 35–40.

References

Firefly
Cars introduced in 1932